The National Lacrosse League dispersal draft is a meeting where the general managers of National Lacrosse League teams choose players from teams that are ceasing operations. The NLL has seen many team changes over the years (the 1993 season was the last time the league had no team changes over the previous season), so dispersal drafts have been commonplace. Recent dispersal drafts have occurred in 2011 (Boston Blazers), 2010 (Orlando Titans), 2009 (Portland LumberJax), 2008 (Arizona Sting, Chicago Shamrox), 2007 (Arizona Sting, Boston Blazers), 2005 (Anaheim Storm), 2004 (Vancouver Ravens), 2003 (Ottawa Rebel), and 2002 (Montréal Express).

2011 Draft results
Players from the Boston Blazers - September 9, 2011

2010 Draft results
Players from the Orlando Titans - August 6, 2010

2009 Draft results
Players from the Portland LumberJax - July 7, 2009

2008 Draft results
There were two separate dispersal drafts in 2008. In June, the Arizona Sting announced that they would not be returning as promised after they decided not to play in the 2008 season. Then just weeks before the 2009 season started, the Chicago Shamrox suspended operations, requiring a second draft.

June 30, 2008
Players from the Arizona Sting

December 12, 2008
Players from the Chicago Shamrox

2007 Draft results
Players from the Arizona Sting and Boston Blazers - November 5, 2007

2005 Draft results
Players from the Anaheim Storm - July 20, 2005

2004 Draft results
Players from the Vancouver Ravens - December 15, 2004

2003 Draft results
Players from the Ottawa Rebel - July 31, 2003

2002 Draft results
Players from the Montreal Express - September 21, 2002

References

See also
 National Lacrosse League entry draft
 National Lacrosse League expansion draft

National Lacrosse League
Drafts (sports)